The following is a list of Grammy Awards winners and nominees from New Zealand:

!scope="col"| 
|-
| 1984 
| 'The Marriage of Figaro' 
| Best Opera Recording - Kiri Te Kanawa 
| 
|style="text-align:center;"|
|-
| 1997 
| 'When I Fall in Love' performed by Natalie Cole, Nat King Cole 
| Best Instrumental Arrangement Accompanying Vocalist - Alan Broadbent 
| 
|style="text-align:center;"|
|-
| 2000 
| 'Lonely Town' 
| Best Instrumental Arrangement Accompanying Vocalist - Alan Broadbent
| 
|style="text-align:center;"|
|-
| 2004 || Sacred Tibetan Chant: The monks of Sherab Ling Monastery || Best Traditional World Music Album - Jon Mark and Thelma Burchell || 
|-
| 2005 
| 'Into The West'
| Best Song written for Visual Media - Fran Walsh 
| 
|style="text-align:center;"|
|-
| 2006 
| 'You'll Think of Me' 
| Best Male Country Vocal Performance - Keith Urban
| 
|style="text-align:center;"|
|-
|rowspan="2"|2008 
| 'The Distant Future' 
| Best Comedy Album - Jemaine Clement and Bret McKenzie 
| 
|style="text-align:center;"|
|-
| 'Stupid Boy' 
| Best Male Country Vocal Performance - Keith Urban 
| 
|style="text-align:center;"|
|-
| 2009 
| 'Billy Budd' 
| Best Opera Recording - Jonathan Lemalu 
| 
|style="text-align:center;"|
|-
| 2010 
| 'Sweet Thing' 
| Best Male Country Vocal Performance - Keith Urban 
| 
|style="text-align:center;"|
|-
| 2011 
| ''Til Summer Comes Around' 
| Best Male Country Vocal Performance - Keith Urban 
| 
|style="text-align:center;"|
|-
|rowspan="2"|2013 || rowspan="2"|'Somebody That I Used to Know' || Best Pop Duo/Group Performance - Kimbra ||  
|rowspan="2" style="text-align:center;"|
|-
| Record of the Year - Kimbra || 
|-
|rowspan="4"| 2014
|rowspan="3"| "Royals"
| Record of the Year - Lorde
|  
|rowspan="4" style="text-align:center;"|
|-
| Song of the Year - Lorde
| 
|-
| Best Pop Solo Performance - Lorde
| 
|-
| Pure Heroine
| Best Pop Vocal Album - Lorde
| 
|-
|rowspan="2"| 2018
| Melodrama
| Album of the Year - Lorde
|  
| style="text-align:center;"|
|-
| What a Beautiful Name 
| Grammy Award for Best Contemporary Christian Music Performance/Song - Brooke Fraser
|  
| style="text-align:center;"|
|-
| 2021
| Jojo Rabbit 
| Grammy Award for Best Compilation Soundtrack for Visual Media - Taika Waititi
|  
| style="text-align:center;"|
|-

|}

References

New Zealand

 Grammy
Grammy
Grammy